Ralf Wagner (born 1968) is a German university professor for administration in the field of business science at the University of Kassel. Since 2006 he has been the chair of the SVI Endowed Chair for International Direct Marketing there.

Life
Ralf Wagner studied business administration with a focus on marketing at Bielefeld University. He received his doctor's degree in 2000 with the title "Modeling and Analysis of Multiple Competitive Interactions with Sales Promotions", while working with Reinhold Decker. Wagner received his Venia legendi for common administration in 2008 from the Bielefeld University for the habilitation paper of "Complex Patterns in Marketing Management". He began at the newly founded Dialog Marketing Competence Center (DMCC) at the University of Kassel as a deputy chair then became a professor.

His fields of study are marketing interaction in different cultures, direct marketing in alteration, competitive interaction, competitive intelligence, and quantitative methods of marketing research.

Books
Decker, R.; R. Wagner (2002): Marketingforschung: Methoden und Modelle zur Bestimmung des Käuferverhaltens, München, Moderne Industrie
Wagner, R. (2001): Multiple Wettbewerbsreaktionen im Produktmanagement, Wiesbaden, DUV & Gabler.

References

External links
 
 

Living people
1968 births
Bielefeld University alumni
Academic staff of the University of Kassel